NiziU is a Japanese girl group formed by JYP Entertainment and Sony Music Entertainment Japan. The group is composed of nine members: Mako, Rio, Maya, Riku, Ayaka, Mayuka, Rima, Miihi, and Nina. NiziU was formed through the reality-survival program Nizi Project (2020) and debuted on December 2, 2020, with the release of their debut single "Step and a Step".

Career

2020: Formation and debut 
On January 29, 2019, JYP Entertainment announced their plans of creating a Japanese girl group, under their vision "K-pop 3.0", "Globalization by Localization." Auditions for this new girl group took place in eight Japanese cities, Hawaii, and Los Angeles, for females aged between 15 and 22 years old. NiziU was formed through Nizi Project, featuring 26 contestants and was aired weekly on Hulu Japan from January 31 to June 26, 2020. It was distributed internationally through JYP Entertainment's official YouTube channel. The show was split up into two seasons: the first season showing the auditions of prospective members around Japan, cutting the prospective lineup to 14 from 26 girls chosen by J.Y. Park; and the second season showing the girls moving to train in South Korea for six months.

On the final episode of Nizi Project, the debut line-up was revealed to the public. As a recording artist under JYP Entertainment, the group is announced to have partnered with record company Sony Music Japan for album sales and group management during their activities in Japan.

The group's digital pre-debut EP, Make You Happy, was pre-released on June 30 in Japan and South Korea, before being released internationally on July 1, 2020. It was a commercial success, topping Billboard Japans Hot Albums chart and Oricon's Digital Albums chart. The album's eponymous lead single topped several major Japanese music charts such as Line Music, AWA, and Rakuten, while debuting at number two on the Billboard Japan Hot 100. "Make You Happy" was also an international success for the group, with the track debuting at number 84 on the Billboard Global Excl. U.S. chart and at number 192 on the Billboard Global 200 chart on its issue dated September 19. On October 14, "Make You Happy" recorded a cumulative number of 100 million streams within 15 weeks of charting on the Japan Hot 100, tying with Official Hige Dandism's "I Love..." and Eito's "Kōsui", with NiziU becoming the fastest female artist to achieve the feat.

In August 2020, Mako, Miihi, Maya, Ayaka, Rio, and Rima made cameo appearances in the music video for "God's Menu" by Stray Kids. In September 2020, all of the members of NiziU appeared in the music video for "Back Door" by Stray Kids with the exception of Miihi, who could not appear due to attending school. From October 23 to December 20, 2020, Miihi briefly went on hiatus for health problems and was absent for most of NiziU's debut promotions. On November 25, 2020, NiziU released the full version music video of their debut single, "Step and a Step." A week later, on December 2, 2020, they officially debuted in Japan with the single's physical release. "Step and a Step" topped Japan's Oricon Singles Chart with 312,000 copies sold within the first week, becoming the second best selling debut single by a female artist in Japan (second only to Hinatazaka46's "Kyun"). The song also topped the Billboard Japan Hot 100, becoming the group's first chart-topper as it sold 318,562 copies in its first week. "Step and a Step" also marked the group's second entry on the Billboard Global Excl. U.S. wherein they charted at number 149 on its issue dated December 5, as well as the Billboard Global 200, with NiziU charting at number 75 on its issue dated December 12.

Despite making their official Japanese debut only on December 2, NiziU performed at the 71st NHK Kōhaku Uta Gassen, the top-rated annual year-end musical show in Japan. They became the fastest artist to have appeared in a Kōhaku Uta Gassen, making their appearance only 29 days after their debut. By the end of the year, it was reported that NiziU ranked high on several Billboard Japan Year-End charts, with the group charting at number 7 on the Year-End Albums, number 13 on the Year-End Streaming, and ranking at number 15 on the Top Artist Chart. The group became one of five recipients of the Special Achievement Award at the 62nd Japan Record Awards.

2021: "Take a Picture" / "Poppin' Shakin", and first studio album 
On January 20, 2021, the group revealed several planned activities for the year through a video released on their official YouTube channel titled "We need U 2021." Future activities include the group's first live showcase, an upcoming second single alongside their first studio album, and the release of their first English song, among others.

NiziU uploaded the music video of their double A-side single "Take a Picture" on March 29, 2021, with the song topping the real-time charts of several major Japanese music sites. In collaboration with Coca-Cola, the song was used for a local commercial of the said product. The song received over 12.5 million streams in its first week, surpassing the first-week streaming numbers of "Step and a Step" and setting an all-time record high on the weekly Oricon Streaming Chart. "Take a Picture / Poppin' Shakin'" was then officially released on April 7, 2021, wherein "Poppin' Shakin'" was used for a commercial in collaboration with Japanese telecommunication company Softbank. The single recorded sales of over 317,000 copies in its first week. On November 24, 2021, NiziU released their first studio album U, along with its lead single "Chopstick".

2022–present: "Clap Clap" 
On April 12, 2022, NiziU released the digital single "Asobo". The English version of the single was released two weeks later. On May 8, the group had their first appearance at KCON  in Seoul, South Korea. However, member Rio was not present for their premiere performance due to a sudden illness in the midst of their rehearsal. On July 20, NiziU released their single "Clap Clap". NiziU embarked on their first Japanese tour, Light it Up, originally scheduled from July 23 to September 17, but was then delayed to August 13 and finally concluded on October 5. This was followed by their first Japanese dome tour, Burn it Up, held at Tokyo Dome and Kyocera Dome Osaka from November 12 to December 18. In between concerts, NiziU released their first ballad  single, "Blue Moon", on December 14. At the last concert, it was announced that the group's upcoming single "Paradise" is the theme song for the movie Doraemon: Nobita's Sky Utopia, scheduled to be released in Japan in March 2023.

Members 
Adapted from NiziU's official website.

  - leader

Discography

Studio albums

Extended plays

Singles

Other charted songs

Concerts and tours

NiziU Live With U 2022 "Light It Up"

NiziU Live With U 2022 "Burn It Up"

Filmography

Reality shows

Videography

Music videos

Awards and nominations

Notes

References

External links 

Japanese girl groups
Japanese idol groups
Japanese pop music groups
2020 establishments in South Korea
2020 establishments in Japan
Musical groups established in 2020
JYP Entertainment artists
Singing talent show winners
Sony Music Entertainment Japan artists